Phukhao Thong is a sub-district (tambon) in Phra Nakhon Si Ayutthaya Province, administered by Phra Nakhon Si Ayutthaya District in central Thailand.

Geography
The sub-district is on the Chao Phraya river about 71 km north of Bangkok and about 3 km north-west of the city of Ayutthaya. Tourist sites include Chedi Phukhao Thong and the adjacent monument to King Naresuan of Ayutthaya.

Neighboring sub-districts are (from the north clockwise) Wat Tum, Lum Phli, Tha Wasukri, Ban Pom, and Ban Mai.

Economy
Employment in Phukhao Thong is based on retail and service industries. Products exported from the tambon include hammocks, fish-shaped mobiles made from palm leaves representing the emblem of Ayutthaya, and fans made from peacock feathers.

Administration
The entire sub-district is administered by a tambon administrative organization (TAO), created in 1999. It is subdivided into four villages (muban).

References

External links
 Phukhao Thong on Thaitambon.com (Thai)

Tambon of Phra Nakhon Si Ayutthaya Province
Populated places in Phra Nakhon Si Ayutthaya province